The November Storm of 1995 was a snowstorm, coming from the North Sea in mid November 1995. Beginning on Thursday  evening, 16 November 1995, the storm culminated on Friday morning, 17 November 1995, striking against the southern and western parts of Sweden. The snowstorm decreased during the Friday afternoon, disappearing from Sweden. Gothenburg with neighbouring places as the strong winds destroyed what had been cleared, creating giant snowdrifts. It wasn't until Tuesday, 21 November 1995, traffic conditions were back to ordinary.

Deep snow
Since measurings begun in 1905, several November records for deep snow were broken.

Traffic
The winds broke trees. Traffic was heavily affected, and people ended up stuck inside their cars. Getting help took a long time (mobile telephones had just become common at this time, but were still not in the hands of everyone). For many children, school was canceled, and many people could not get to work.

Sports
Sports were heavily affected, postponing events to other days, because of problems for clubs traveling to and home from away games. Svenska basketligan games were moved from Friday to the upcoming days, and the 1995 edition of motorcycle event Novemberkåsan was moved from the upcoming Sunday until December.

References

1995 in Sweden
Storms
1995 natural disasters
Weather events in Sweden
Winter weather events
November 1995 events in Europe
1995 disasters in Sweden